Vladimir Stepanovich Ikonnikov was a Russian Imperial historian specializing in study of the Russian historiography.
Ikonnikov was an academician of the Saint Petersburg Academy of Sciences, a professor and a dean of the History and Philology faculty of the Kiev University.

Born in Kiev in the family of a landlord, who belonged to Russian Nobility.  In 1852-1861 Ikonnikov studied in Kiev Kadet School on state funds. In 1861-1865 he studied at the Kiev University History and Philology faculty at the department of Russian history. Soon after his graduation, Ikonnikov was teaching history in Kiev Military Gymnasium and history of general literature in Kiev Institute for Noble Maidens. In 1866-67 he was a privatdozent at Kharkov University. In 1867 Ikonnikov was teaching history and philology in several gymnasiums in Odessa. Here in Odessa University in 1867 he defended his dissertation "Maksim Grek. Historical and literary research" receiving a magister degree in Russian history. In 1869 he defended his doctorate dissertation at the same university "Research experience of cultural significance of Byzantium Empire in Russian History. After that Ikonnikov headed the department of Russian history in the Kiev University.

In 1870 he received a title of professor. In 1873-1913 Ikonnikov was an acting chief editor of "Universitetskie izvestiya" (University News) published by Kiev University. Between 1877 to 1887 he served as a dean of the Kiev University History and Philology faculty. In 1874-1877 and 1893-1895 Ikonnikov was a chairman of Nestor the Chronicler Historical Society. In 1878-1889 he was a director of Kiev Higher Women Courses. In 1904 Ikonnikov was placed in charge of the Provisional Commission in research of ancient documents in Kiev.

He is a brother of the Kiev Governorate architect Mikhail Ikonnikov and a father-in-law of Vsevolod Petrov.

Important works
 "Maksim Grek. Historical and literary research" Kiev, 1865–66
 "Russian public figures in the 16th century" 1866
 "Research experience of cultural significance of Byzantium Empire in Russian History Kiev, 1869
 "Sceptical school in Russian historiography" Kiev, 1871
 "Count N.S. Mordvinov. Historical monograph" Saint Petersburg, 1873
 "Experience of Russian historiography" Kiev, 1892
 "Kiev 1648-1855. Historical essay 1904
 "Peasants movement in Kiev Governorate in 1826-27" 1905

External links
  
 Voitsekhivska, I.N. Ikonnikov Volodymyr Stepanovych. Encyclopedia of History of Ukraine.
 Rubinshtein, N.L. Ikonnikov, Vladimir Stepanovich. Great Soviet Encyclopedia.

1841 births
1923 deaths
Scientists from Kyiv
Ukrainian people in the Russian Empire
20th-century Ukrainian historians
Historians from the Russian Empire
Historiography of Russia
Members of the National Academy of Sciences of Ukraine
Full members of the Saint Petersburg Academy of Sciences
19th-century Ukrainian historians